{{Infobox person
| name               = Jack Hill
| image              = JackHill1968.jpg
| caption            = Hill editing "Pit Stop"1968
| birth_date         = 
| birth_place        = Los Angeles, California, U.S.
| yearsactive        = 1960–82
| occupation         = Film director
| education          = UCLA
| nationality        = American
| spouse             = 
| notable_works      = The Big Bird Cage – 1972 Coffy – 1973Foxy Brown – 1974
}}
Jack Hill (born January 28, 1933) is an American film director in the exploitation film genre. Several of Hill's later films have been characterized as feminist works.

Early life
Hill was born January 28, 1933, in Los Angeles, California. His mother, Mildred (née Pannill, b. February 1, 1907; death date n.a.), was a music teacher. His father, Roland Everett Hill (February 5, 1895 – November 10, 1986), worked as a set designer and art director for First National Pictures and Warner Bros. on films including The Jazz Singer, Captain Blood, Action in the North Atlantic, and Captain Horatio Hornblower, and as well was an architect who designed the centerpiece Sleeping Beauty Castle at Disneyland in California.

Hill attended UCLA, which he attended, he said, for "a couple of years" before leaving to get married and then returning to earn a degree in music. While a student, he played in a symphony orchestra that performed for the soundtracks of Doctor Zhivago and The Brothers Karamazov, and he arranged music for burlesque performers; through this he met comedian Lenny Bruce, whose daughter Kitty Bruce would act in Hill's 1975 film Switchblade Sisters. He went on to postgraduate studies at UCLA Film School, where instructor and former movie director Dorothy Arzner encouraged Hill and his classmate and friend Francis Ford Coppola. Hill worked as a cameraman, a sound recorder (including on Coppola's student short Ayamonn the Terrible), and an editor on student films. His short The Host starred Sid Haig, an acting student at the Pasadena Playhouse under teacher Arzner, who introduced them; this marked the first of several films together.

Career

Hill went on to work with Coppola on several of Coppola's early movies, including producer Roger Corman's 1963 movie The Terror. He added 20 minutes to 1960's Wasp Woman for its eventual television syndication release, shooting without access to any original cast-member.

Legacy
Quentin Tarantino's company Rolling Thunder Pictures re-released Switchblade Sisters theatrically in 1996. In the introduction to the film's DVD release, Tarantino calls Hill " “the Howard Hawks of exploitation filmmaking”.

Hill's discoveries include Pam Grier, who starred in four of his films from The Big Doll House through Foxy Brown; Sid Haig, who acts in most of Hill's films, beginning with Spider Baby; and Ellen Burstyn, who starred in Pit Stop.

His student film The Host was a partial influence on former classmate Francis Ford Coppola's Apocalypse Now. Hill recalled in a 2000s interview that when he made The Host,

Film scholar Wheeler Winston Dixon believed that for Hill and fellow low-budget auteur Monte Hellman, film was primarily a means of personal expression while remaining a "deeply financially dependent medium". Dixon wrote that Hill and Hellman's movies often were sufficiently successful while remaining true to their personal vision.

Archive
The moving image collection of Jack Hill is held at the Academy Film Archive. The Academy Film Archive preserved Spider Baby in 2013.

 Filmography 
Film crewBattle Beyond the Sun (1962) - additional cinematography
 The Wasp Woman (1962) (uncredited) - 20-minute introduction for TV syndication, shot in 1962
 The Bellboy and the Playgirls (1963) - editor
 The Terror (1963) - uncredited director and co-writer
 City on Fire (1979) - writer
 Death Ship (1980) - writer

As director
 The Host (short; made 1960-61) - director
 Mondo Keyhole (1966) - director
 Blood Bath (a.k.a. Track of the Vampire) (1966) - co-director
 Spider Baby (a.k.a. The Maddest Story Ever Told) (1967) - writer, director
 House of Evil (1968) (US scenes) - director
 Fear Chamber (1968) (US scenes) - director
 Pit Stop (1969) - director
 Ich, ein Groupie (a.k.a. Higher and Higher) (1970) (uncredited) - co-director
 The Snake People (1971) (US scenes) - director
 The Incredible Invasion (a.k.a. Alien Terror) (1971) (US scenes) - director
 The Big Doll House (1971) - director
 The Big Bird Cage (1972) - director
 Coffy (1973) - writer, director
 Foxy Brown (1974) - director
 The Swinging Cheerleaders (1974) - writer, director
 Switchblade Sisters (1975) - writer, director
 Sorceress'' (1982) - writer, director (as Brian Stuart)

References

External links

Interview with Jack Hill

1933 births

Living people
Girls with guns films

Film directors from Texas
Blaxploitation film directors